Umbellula is a genus of cnidarians in the monotypic family Umbellulidae. The genus contains bioluminescent species.

References

Further reading
Williams, G.C.; van der Land, J. (2001). Octocorallia - Pennatulacea. in: Costello, M.J. et al. (Ed.) (2001). European register of marine species: a check-list of the marine species in Europe and a bibliography of guides to their identification. Collection Patrimoines Naturels 50: pp. 105-106.
Williams, G.C. (1992). Biogeography of the octocorallian coelenterate fauna of southern Africa. Biol. J. Linn. Soc. 46: 351-401.
Williams, G.C. (1999). Index Pennatulacea: annotated bibliography and indexes of the Sea Pens (Coelenterata: Octocorallia) of the World 1469-1999. Proc. Calif. Acad. Sci. 51(2): 19-103, 1 fig., 14 plates.
Liu, J.Y. [Ruiyu] (ed.). (2008). Checklist of marine biota of China seas. China Science Press. 1267 pp.
Cairns, S.D.; Gershwin, L.; Brook, F.J.; Pugh, P.; Dawson, E.W.; Ocaña O.V.; Vervoort, W.; Williams, G.; Watson, J.E.; Opresko, D.M.; Schuchert, P.; Hine, P.M.; Gordon, D.P.; Campbell, H.J.; Wright, A.J.; Sánchez, J.A.; Fautin, D.G. (2009). Phylum Cnidaria: corals, medusae, hydroids, myxozoans. in: Gordon, D.P. (Ed.) (2009). New Zealand inventory of biodiversity: 1. Kingdom Animalia: Radiata, Lophotrochozoa, Deuterostomia. pp. 59-101., available online at http://si-pddr.si.edu/handle/10088/8431

Octocorallia genera
Bioluminescent cnidarians
Umbellulidae
Taxa named by John Edward Gray